Conus mus, common name the mouse cone, is a species of sea snail, a marine gastropod mollusk in the family Conidae, the cone snails and their allies.

Like all species within the genus Conus, these snails are predatory and venomous. They are capable of "stinging" humans, therefore live ones should be handled carefully or not at all.

Distribution
This shallow-water species occurs in the Caribbean Sea and the Gulf of Mexico; 
in the Western Atlantic from North Carolina, USA and the Bermudas to Venezuela
including the Eastern Caribbean island chain, and Barbados.

Description 
The maximum recorded shell length is 43.5 mm. The shell has a tubercuiated spire. The body whorl is covered by narrow, raised revolving striae. Its color is ash-white, longitudinally streaked and maculated with chestnut. The tubercles of the spire are white, and there is usually a white band below the middle of the body whorl. The aperture is chestnut-colored, with a central white band.

Habitat 
Minimum recorded depth is 0 m. Maximum recorded depth is 18 m.

References

 Bruguière, [J.-G.] 1792. Encyclopédie Méthodique. Histoire Naturelle des Vers. Encyclopédie Méthodique. Histoire Naturelle des Vers 1: 345–757. Panckoucke: Paris.
 Tucker J.K. & Tenorio M.J. (2009) Systematic classification of Recent and fossil conoidean gastropods. Hackenheim: Conchbooks. 296 pp. 
 Puillandre N., Duda T.F., Meyer C., Olivera B.M. & Bouchet P. (2015). One, four or 100 genera? A new classification of the cone snails. Journal of Molluscan Studies. 81: 1–23

Gallery

External links
 The Conus Biodiversity website
 Cone Shells – Knights of the Sea
 

mus
Gastropods described in 1792